Urban Lennartsson (born 2 May 1962) is a Swedish volleyball player. He competed in the men's tournament at the 1988 Summer Olympics.

References

External links
 

1962 births
Living people
Swedish men's volleyball players
Olympic volleyball players of Sweden
Volleyball players at the 1988 Summer Olympics
Sportspeople from Stockholm